Tiger Lin (born 1962; Chinese name：林振辉 LIN Zhenhui) has been an executive director and the chief executive officer of CITIC Telecom International Holdings Limited since 1 January 2015. Tiger Lin is also the corporate representative of the company on the board of CTM, and a director of Hong Kong Applied Science and Technology Research Institute Company Limited.

Tiger Lin was formerly the deputy managing director of China Mobile Guangdong Co., Ltd. and chairman and president of China Mobile Yunnan Company Limited. Before joining the company, Tiger Lin was the chairman of China Mobile Hong Kong Company Limited and the chairman and chief executive officer of China Mobile International Limited.

Tiger Lin is a professorate senior engineer. He obtained a bachelor's degree of Engineering from the Beijing University of Post and Telecommunications, a master's degree of Business Administration from The Australian National University and a Doctor degree of Business Administration from The Hong Kong Polytechnic University.

Major work 

Referred as the father of M-Zone, Tiger Lin created one of China Mobile's most successful customer brands targeting the youth segment. He led the “Communicating with Hearts” corporate branding campaign in Guangdong Province, which was well known to every household in China. He was also one of the pioneers in China to study the internet and mobile internet industry.

On April 25, 2012, China Mobile Hong Kong launched its 4G LTE service and a "Pioneering Hong Kong-China Cross-border Data Sharing Plan". Tiger Lin said on the press lease, “Technology is meant to serve people's needs and this is well reflected in the technology arena. The development of communications technology and the Internet is underscored by two fundamental human needs: creating equality and providing humans with more freedom. The uses of the internet have harnessed the integration of various telecommunications networks and services. ”

In an interview with China Daily in April 2014, Tiger Lin mentioned China Mobile Hong Kong has become one of the top three telecom operators in Hong Kong by subscriber numbers.

In November 2013, China Mobile International announced the launch of Jego, a VoIP mobile application, to grow its international retail business.“I am proud to introduce Jego internationally, an application which is going to benefit people with close connections to Mainland China, in particular overseas Chinese, and provide a whole new experience.” said Dr. Tiger LIN Zhenhui, chairman and CEO, China Mobile International. “In the past, if people wanted to continue to use their Mainland China numbers overseas, they had to carry an extra SIM card. Now people can communicate with each other through Jego worldwide as if they were in Mainland China.”

On 29 June 2017, Dr. Tiger Lin, CEO of CITIC Telecom was interviewed by the People's Daily Online in the MWC Shanghai to talk about the group's development plan in the ‘Belt and Road’ regions and outlook of 5G technology. He said"4G changed internet to mobile internet. And 5G changes impossible to possible, unknown to known."

References

External links 
  Tiger Lin Bio on CITIC Tel webpage
  SCMP news report

Living people
Businesspeople from Guangdong
China Mobile
1962 births